The 2009 Philadelphia International Championship was the 25th running of the cycling race, which took place on June 7, 2009. It was won by 's André Greipel.

Results

External links

2009 in road cycling
2009 in American sports